Melvin Lee Davis is an American bass player, vocalist, keyboard player, producer, TV composer and engineer based in Orange County, California. He is the music director for Grammy-award winning artist Chaka Khan and has recorded with The Pointer Sisters, Lee Ritenour, Bryan Ferry, Patti Austin and Gladys Knight & the Pips. He co-wrote "Soul Train's a-Comin", the theme song for the television show Soul Train. His albums, Tomorrow's Yesterday and Nature's Serenade were released through The Orchard; LTV: Love, Truth & Victory was released through P-Vine Records.

Early life and career
Born and raised in Orange County, Melvin Lee Davis played the violin at age four and the saxophone at age six; he took up  guitar while he was in high school. He was discovered by a saxophone player in Buddy Miles's jazz band who was dating his sister while Davis was playing at a club. Miles flew Davis to New York City to audition and hired him on the spot.

Davis played in New York City clubs and met Soul Train producer Don Cornelius through a mutual friend, Ron Kersey. According to Davis, Davis made many of his contacts in R&B through Cornelius. "...if you were a black musician in the business of making R&B and soul music and wanted to get on television, you had to go through Don Cornelius," he said.

His association with Cornelius lead him to co-write the Soul Train theme, "Soul Train's A-Comin'". Davis has worked for Grammy award winning singer Chaka Khan as a session and touring bassist in addition to music director. He's also worked with Lee Ritenour, Patti Austin, Gladys Knight & the Pips, The Pointer Sisters, and Bryan Ferry.

Discography
 Nature's Serenade (2003)
 Tomorrow’s Yesterday (2000)
 LTV: Love, Truth & Victory (1996)
 Genre: Music (2011)

Selected credits
With Lee Ritenour
 Alive in L.A. This Is Love Rit's House Wes Bound Smoke 'n' Mirrors 6 String TheoryWith George Benson
 Love Remembers Standing Together IrreplaceableWith Patti Austin
 That Secret Place ReachWith others
 Gladys Knight & the Pips, All Our Love Allen Hinds, Touch''

References

External links

Living people
Musicians from Orange County, California
American blues guitarists
American rock guitarists
Electric blues musicians
Guitarists from California
Year of birth missing (living people)